Marianna Böhmová (1750–after 1806) was an opera singer. She was engaged in Prague (1768–70), Brno (1770–76) and then touring Austria and Southern Germany, where she was regarded as a singer of note in 1776–1792, before becoming the leader of her own operatic company. She was one of the first Czech opera singers.

References 

 Starší divadlo v českých zemích do konce 18. století. Osobnosti a díla, ed. A. Jakubcová, Praha: Divadelní ústav – Academia 2007 (in Czech).
 

1750 births
19th-century deaths
18th-century Bohemian women opera singers